The 2017 Kobe Challenger was a professional tennis tournament played on indoor hard courts. It was the 3rd edition of the tournament which was part of the 2017 ATP Challenger Tour. It took place in Kobe, Japan between 6 and 12 November 2017.

Singles main-draw entrants

Seeds

 1 Rankings are as of 30 October 2017.

Other entrants
The following players received wildcards into the singles main draw:
  Yuya Kibi
  Ken Onishi
  Yuta Shimizu
  Kaito Uesugi

The following player received entry into the singles main draw as a special exempt:
  Hubert Hurkacz

The following players received entry from the qualifying draw:
  Sora Fukuda
  Marinko Matosevic
  Lucas Miedler
  Yosuke Watanuki

Champions

Singles

 Stéphane Robert def.  Calvin Hemery 7–6(7–1), 6–7(5–7), 6–1.

Doubles

 Ben McLachlan /  Yasutaka Uchiyama def.  Jeevan Nedunchezhiyan /  Christopher Rungkat 4–6, 6–3, [10–8].

External links
Official Website

2017 ATP Challenger Tour
2017
2017 in Japanese tennis